Norah Lofts, née Norah Ethel Robinson, (27 August 190410 September 1983) was a 20th-century  British writer. She also wrote under the pen names Peter Curtis and Juliet Astley. She wrote more than fifty books specialising in historical fiction, but she also wrote some mysteries, short stories and non-fiction. Many of her novels, including her Suffolk Trilogy, follow the history of  specific houses and their residents over several generations.

Personal life

Norah Ethel Robinson was born in Shipdham, Norfolk to Isaac Robinson and Ethel Garner, and grew up in Bury St Edmunds where she was educated at Guildhall Feoffment Girls School and the County Grammar School for Girls in the town. In 1925 she attained a teaching diploma from Norwich Training College.

She married Geoffrey Lofts in 1931 with whom she had one son, Clive. Geoffrey died in 1948. 
Lofts wed her second husband, Robert Jorisch, a technical consultant to the British Sugar Corporation at the town's sugar beet factory, in 1949. She stood as a Town Councillor for Bury St Edmunds from 1957 to 1962, where she died in 1983.

Work
Lofts chose to release her murder-mystery novels under the pen name Peter Curtis because she did not want the readers of her historic fiction to pick up a murder-mystery novel and expect classic Lofts historical fiction. However, the murders still show characteristic Lofts elements. Most of her historical novels fall into two general categories: biographical novels about queens, among them Anne Boleyn, Isabella I of Castile, and Catherine of Aragon; and novels set in East Anglia centered around the fictitious town of Baildon (patterned largely on Bury St. Edmunds). Her creation of this fictitious area of England is reminiscent of Thomas Hardy's creation of "Wessex"; and her use of recurring characters such that the protagonist of one novel appears as a secondary character in others is even more reminiscent of William Faulkner's work set in "Yoknapatawpha County," Mississippi. Lofts' work set in East Anglia in the 1930s and 1940s shows great concern with the very poor in society and their inability to change their conditions. Her approach suggests an interest in the social reform that became a feature of British post-war society.

She was not afraid to tackle potentially sensitive subjects; her version of the nativity of Jesus, with backstories of Mary, Joseph, the Magi, the shepherds - even the innkeeper - is rendered in How Far to Bethlehem? as is the ill-fated Donner Party  expedition in Road to Revelation (aka Winter Harvest).

Several of her novels were turned into films. Jassy was filmed as Jassy (1947) starring Margaret Lockwood and Dennis Price. You're Best Alone was filmed as Guilt Is My Shadow (1950). The Devil's Own (also known as The Little Wax Doll and Catch as Catch Can) was filmed as The Witches (1966). The film 7 Women (1966) was directed by John Ford and loosely based on her story "Chinese Finale".
Her books still have a devoted international readership, notably on the Goodreads website.

Honours
In the United States, she won a National Book Award for I Met a Gypsy, voted by members of the American Booksellers Association. Specifically, her collection was "the 'forgotten book' of the year (1936) that least deserved to be forgotten" (subsequently termed the Bookseller Discovery). Alfred Knopf represented her at the ceremony.

Bibliography

Novels
 Here Was a Man: A Romantic History of Sir Walter Raleigh, London: Methuen & New York: Knopf, 1936; reprinted, Hodder & Stoughton, 1976.
 White Hell of Pity, London: Methuen & New York: Knopf, 1937; reprinted, Manor, 1975.
 Out of This Nettle, London: Gollancz, 1938; published as Colin Lowrie New York : Knopf, 1939, reprinted under original title, Manor, 1976.
 Requiem for Idols, London : Methuen & New York: Knopf, 1938: reprinted, Corgi Books, 1972.
 Blossom Like the Rose, London: Gollancz & New York: Knopf, 1939; reprinted, Manor, 1976.
 Hester Roon, London: Davies & New York: Knopf, 1940; reprinted, Corgi Books, 1978.
 The Road to Revelation, London: Davies, 1941; reprinted, Corgi Books, 1976; reprinted Winter Harvest New York: Doubleday, 1955; reprinted, Fawcett, 1976.
 The Brittle Glass, London: Joseph, 1942; New York: Knopf, 1943; reprinted, Fawcett, 1977.
 Michael and All Angels, London: Joseph, 1943; published as The Golden Fleece, New York: Knopf, 1944; reprinted, Fawcett, 1977.
 Jassy, London: Joseph & New York: Knopf, 1944; reprinted, Fawcett, 1979; re-published, paperback and Kindle-format ebook, Tree of Life Publishing 2009.
 To See a Fine Lady, London: Joseph & New York: Knopf, 1946; reprinted, Fawcett, 1976.
 Silver Nutmeg, London: Joseph & New York: Doubleday, 1947; reprinted, Corgi Books, 1974.
 A Calf for Venus, London: Joseph & New York: Doubleday, 1949; published as Letty, Pyramid Publications, 1968, reprinted under original title, Corgi Books, 1974.
 Esther, New York: Macmillan, 1950; reprinted, Corgi Books, 1973; re-published, paperback and Kindle-format ebook, Tree of Life Publishing 2007.
 The Lute Player, London: Joseph & New York: Doubleday, 1951; reprinted, Fawcett, 1976.
 Bless This House, London: Joseph & New York: Doubleday, 1954 (as Literary Guild selection); reprinted, Queens House, 1977; re-published, paperback and Kindle-format ebook, Tree of Life Publishing 2011.
 Queen in Waiting, London: Joseph, 1955; New York: 1958; as Eleanor the Queen: The Story of the Most Famous Woman of the Middle Ages, New York: Doubleday, 1955; reprinted under original title, Fawcett, 1977.
 Afternoon of an Autocrat, London: Joseph & New York: Doubleday, 1956; published as The Deadly Gift, Pyramid Publications, 1967; published as The Devil in Clevely, London: Morley Baker, 1968; published under original title, Hodder & Stoughton, 1978; re-published, paperback and Kindle-format ebook as The Devil in Clevely, Tree of Life Publishing 2012.
 Scent of Cloves, New York: Doubleday, 1957; reprinted, Queens House, 1977; re-published, paperback and Kindle-format ebook, Tree of Life Publishing 2013.
 The House Trilogy:
 The Town House, London: Hutchinson & New York: Doubleday, 1959; reprinted, Fawcett, 1976.
 The House at Old Vine, London: Hutchinson & New York: Doubleday, 1961; reprinted, Queens House, 1977.
 The House at Sunset, New York: Doubleday, 1962; London: Hutchinson, 1963; reprinted, Fawcett, 1978.
 The Concubine: A Novel Based Upon the Life of Anne Boleyn, New York: Doubleday, 1963; London: Hutchinson, 1964; published as Concubine, London: Arrow Books, 1965.
 How Far to Bethlehem? London: Hutchinson & New York: Doubleday, 1965; re-published, paperback and Kindle-format ebook, Tree of Life Publishing 2007.
 The Lost Ones, London: Hutchinson, 1969; as The Lost Queen, New York: Doubleday, 1969.
 Madselin, London: Corgi Books, 1969; New York: Bantam, 1970.
 The King's Pleasure: A Novel of Katharine of Aragon, New York: Doubleday, 1969; London: Hodder and Stoughton, 1970.
 Lovers All Untrue, London: Hodder and Stoughton & New York: Doubleday, 1970.
 A Rose for Virtue: The Very Private Life of Hortense, London: Hodder and Stoughton & New York: Doubleday, 1971.
 Charlotte, London: Hodder and Stoughton, 1972; published as Out of the Dark, New York: Doubleday, 1972.
 The Maude Reed Tale, New York: Dell, 1972.
 Uneasy Paradise 1973; published as Her Own Special Island, London: Transworld Publishers, 1975.
 Nethergate, London: Hodder and Stoughton & New York: Doubleday, 1973.
 Crown of Aloes, London: Hodder and Stoughton & New York: Doubleday, 1974.
 Checkmate, London: Corgi Books, 1975; New York: Fawcett, 1978.
 Walk into My Parlour, London: Corgi Books, 1975.
 The Suffolk Trilogy:
 Knight's Acre London: Hodder and Stoughton, 1974; & New York: Doubleday, 1975.
 The Homecoming, London: Hodder & Stoughton, 1975; New York: Doubleday, 1976.
 The Lonely Furrow, London: Hodder & Stoughton, 1976; New York: Doubleday, 1977.
 Gad's Hall, London: Hodder & Stoughton, 1977; New York: Doubleday, 1978.
 Haunted House, London: Hodder & Stoughton, 1978; published as The Haunting of Gad's Hall, New York: Doubleday, 1979.
 The Day of the Butterfly, London: Bodley Head, 1979; New York: Doubleday, 1980.
 A Wayside Tavern, London: Hodder and Stoughton & New York: Doubleday, 1980.
 The Claw, London: Hodder & Stoughton, 1981; New York: Doubleday, 1982.
 The Old Priory, London: Bodley Head, 1981; New York: Doubleday, 1982.
 Pargeters, London: Hodder & Stoughton, 1984; New York: Doubleday, 1986.

Short story collections
 I Met a Gypsy, London: Methuen & New York: Knopf, 1935.
 Heaven in Your Hand and Other Stories, New York: Doubleday, 1958; London: Joseph, 1959; reprinted, Fawcett, 1975.
 Is There Anybody There? London: Corgi Books, 1974; published as Hauntings: Is There Anybody There?, New York: Doubleday, 1975.
 Saving Face and Other Stories, London: Hodder & Stoughton, 1983; New York: Doubleday, 1984.

Other publications
 Women in the Old Testament: Twenty Psychological Portraits, London: Sampson Low & New York: Macmillan, 1949.
 Eternal France: A History of France, 1789-1944, with Margery Weiner, New York: Doubleday, 1968; London: Hodder & Stoughton, 1969.
 The Story of Maude Reed (for children), London: Transworld, 1971; published as The Maude Reed Tale, New York: Nelson, 1972.
 Rupert Hatton's Tale (for children), London: Carousel Books, 1972; published as Rupert Hatton's Story, New York: Nelson, 1973 (Junior Literary Guild selection).
 Domestic Life in England, London: Weidenfeld & Nicolson, 1976; New York: Doubleday, 1977.
 Queens of Britain, London: Hodder & Stoughton, 1977; published as Queens of England, New York: Doubleday, 1977.
 Emma Hamilton, London: Joseph & New York: Coward McCann, 1978.
 Anne Boleyn, London: Orbis & New York: Coward McCann, 1979.

Novels published under the pseudonym Juliet Astley
 The Fall of Midas, New York: Coward McCann, 1975; London: Joseph, 1976.
 Copsi Castle, London: Joseph & New York: Coward McCann, 1978.

Novels published under the pseudonym Peter Curtis
 Dead March in Three Keys, London: Davis, 1940; published as No Question of Murder, New York: Doubleday, 1959; published as Bride of Moat House, by Norah Lofts, New York: Fawcett, 1975.
 You're Best Alone, London: Macdonald, 1943, reprinted, Corgi Books, 1971; published with Requiem for Idols, in Two by Norah Lofts, New York: Doubleday, 1981.
 Lady Living Alone, London: Macdonald, 1945.
 The Devil's Own, London: Macdonald & New York: Doubleday, 1960; published as The Witches, London: Pan Books, 1966; published as The Little Wax Doll, New York: Doubleday, 1970; published as Catch as Catch Can.

References

External links 

 
 
 
 Juliet Astley at LC Authorities, with 2 records, and at WorldCat

1904 births
1983 deaths
20th-century English women writers
English historical novelists
National Book Award winners
20th-century English novelists
Women historical novelists
English women novelists
English mystery writers
Women mystery writers
Writers from Bury St Edmunds